According to The Washington Post, the United States Strategic Command contingency plan for dealing with "imminent" threats is formally known as CONPLAN 8022-02.  The plan was reportedly completed in November 2003, resulting in a preemptive and offensive strike capability.  The main plan involves the preemptive use of tactical nuclear strikes (mini-nukes) on deep-ground rocket/bomb installations, computer viruses, and radar disruption technology. 

See: Single Integrated Operational Plan for origins and details.

External links 
 Washington Post article about CONPLAN 8022

United States Department of Defense plans